The Mineralogical Society of Great Britain and Ireland began in 1876. Its main purpose is to disseminate scientific knowledge of the Mineral Sciences (mineralogy) as it may be applied to the fields of crystallography, geochemistry, petrology, environmental science and economic geology. In support of this vision, the society publishes scientific journals, books and monographs. It also organizes and sponsors scientific meetings, and the society connects with other societies which have similar scientific interests. Some of these other societies are the International Mineralogical Association, the European Mineralogical Union, the Mineralogical Society of America, the Mineralogical Association of Canada, the Geological Society of London, IOM3, the North of England Institute of Mining and Mechanical Engineers and the Microbiology Society.

Publications
The Society publishes a variety of book series; these are entitled the "Landmark Series", the "Mineralogical Society Special Series", and the "Monograph series". It also publishes scientific journals entitled Mineralogical Magazine, Clay Minerals, and the EMU Notes in Mineralogy. From 1920 to 2008 it also published the Mineralogical Abstracts bibliographic database. Mineralogical Magazine and Clay Minerals are hybrid journals, publishing both subscription-based and open access articles.

Awards and honours 
Aside from the denotation of senior members or Fellows of the Society that are permitted to use the post-nomial 'FMinSoc', the Society recognises distinguished accomplishments through medals, lectures, honorary fellowships and awards:
The Mineralogical Society-Schlumberger Award, given since 1990 through the generous sponsorship of Schlumberger Cambridge Research, is the most prestigious honour bestowed by the Society. It is awarded to recognise scientific excellence in mineralogy and its applications.
The Max Hey Medal, given since 1993, recognises research of excellence carried out by young workers, within 15 years of the award of their first degree.  It is named in honour of Max H. Hey (1904-1984), eminent British mineralogist.
The Collins Medal, given since 2010, is awarded annually to a scientist who has made an outstanding contribution to Mineral Sciences. The award is named after Joseph Henry Collins (1841–1916), mineralogist and one of the founding members of the Society.
 Mineralogical Society lectures: Hallimond Lecture, George Brown Lecture, Society Distinguished Lecturer Programme.
 Honorary membership/fellowship.
 Undergraduate student awards.

Schlumberger Award recipients
Source: Mineralogical Society

2020 Geoffrey M. Gadd
2019 Sergey Krivovichev
2018 Jonathan Lloyd
2017 Maggie Cusack  
2016 Liane G. Benning
2015 Simon Harley
2014 Barbara Maher
2013 Michael A. Carpenter
2012 Simon Redfern
2011 Georges Calas
2010 Randy Parrish
2009 John Brodholt
2008 Dave Rubie
2007 Roger Powell
2006 David Vaughan
2005 Reinhard Boehler
2004 Dave Manning
2003 Hugh O'Neill
2002 Christopher Hawkesworth
2001 Tim Holland
2000 Paul Nadeau
1999 David Price
1998 Ekhard Salje
1997 Tony Fallick
1996 Mike Henderson 
1995 Paul Ribbe
1994 Frank Hawthorne
1993 Ian Parsons
1992 Ian Carmichael
1991 Bernie Wood 
1990 Jeff Wilson

Max Hey Medal recipients 
Source: Mineralogical Society

 2020  E. Kiseeva
 2019  Thomas Műller
 2018  Oliver Lord
 2017  Victoria Coker
 2016  Philip Pogge von Strandmann
 2015  Stuart J. Mills
 2014  Chris Greenwell
 2013  Nicholas J. Tosca and Hendrik Heinz  (joint winners)
 2012  Madeleine Humphreys
 2011  Dan Morgan
 2010  Takeshi Kasama
 2009  Andrew Walker
 2008  Diego Gatta
 2007  Michele Warren
 2006  A. Dominic Fortes
 2005  Paul Hoskin
 2004  Mark E. Hodson and Lidunka Vocadlo  (joint winners)
 2003  R.J. Harrison
 2002  Dan J. Frost
 2001  Andrew C. Kerr
 2000  Ian C.W. Fitzsimons and R.W. Kent (joint winners)
 1999  Alison Pawley
 1998  M.R. Lee
 1997  Jamie J. Wilkinson
 1996  no award
 1995  Simon C. Kohn
 1994  Simon Anthony Turner Redfern
 1993  Ross John Angel

See also
Mineralogical Abstracts database
The Clay Minerals Society

References

External links

1876 establishments in the United Kingdom
Geology societies
Mineralogy
Organisations based in the London Borough of Richmond upon Thames
Professional associations based in the United Kingdom
Scientific organisations based in the United Kingdom
Scientific organizations established in 1876
Twickenham